Isodictyidae is a family of marine demosponges.

Genera
Genera in the family include:
 Coelocarteria Burton, 1934
 Isodictya Bowerbank, 1864

References

Sponge families
Poecilosclerida